The year 1691 in music involved some significant events.

Events
July – Johann Heinrich Buttstett succeeds Nicolaus Vetter as organist of the Predigerkirche in Erfurt.

Published popular music
"The Bachelor's Answer to the Helpless Maiden"
"The Charming Regent's Wish"

Classical music
Giovanni Battista Alveri – Mia Vita
John Blow – Ode for St Cecilia's Day
Marc-Antoine Charpentier – Marche de triomphe et air, H.547
Gottfried Finger – A Collection of Musick in Two Parts
Domenico Galli – Trattenimento musicale sopra il violoncello
Elisabeth Jacquet de La Guerre – Jeux à l’honneur de la Victoire
Bianca Maria Meda – Cari Musici (motet)
Françoise-Charlotte de Senneterre Ménétou – Airs sérieux
Henry Purcell  
The Gordion Knot Untied, Z.597
The Old Bachelor, Z.607 (pub. 1697)

Publications
Andreas Werckmeister – Musicalische Temperatur

Opera
The following operas were composed:
Henry Purcell – King Arthur (with libretto by John Dryden)
Bernardo Sabadini – Diomede punito da Alcide
Agostino Steffani – Orlando generoso

Births
June 14 – Jan Francisci, organist and composer (died 1758)
December – Conrad Friedrich Hurlebusch, organist and composer (died 1765)
date unknown – Francesco Feo, opera composer (died 1761)

Deaths
April 23 – Jean-Henri d'Anglebert, composer (born 1629)
unknown date – Adriano Morsell, librettist (birth year unknown)

References

 
17th century in music
Music by year